Travis (October 21, 1995 – February 16, 2009) was a male common chimpanzee who, as an animal actor, appeared in several television shows and commercials, including spots for Coca-Cola, as well as on television programs including The Maury Povich Show and The Man Show, which is disputed. On February 16, 2009, Travis attacked and mauled his owner's friend in Stamford, Connecticut, blinding her, severing several body parts and lacerating her face, before he was shot and killed by a responding police officer.

Socialization 
Travis was born to Suzy and Coco, who were imported from Africa to the U.S. sometime in the 1970s. He was born near Festus, Missouri on October 21, 1995, at Mike and Connie Braun Casey's compound, currently named the Missouri Chimpanzee Sanctuary. In a separate incident, Suzy was fatally shot following an escape in 2001. Sandra and Jerome Herold purchased Travis for $50,000 from a breeder after he was taken from his mother when he was three days old. They named the chimpanzee after Sandra's favorite singer, Travis Tritt. The Herolds raised Travis at their home at Rock Rimmon Road in the North Stamford section of Stamford, Connecticut. Travis was the Herolds' constant companion and would often accompany them to work and on their shopping excursions in town. The Herolds owned a towing company, and Travis would pose for photos at the shop and ride with the tow truck, his seatbelt buckled as he wore a baseball shirt. Travis became well known in the town and had been known to greet police officers they would encounter when towing cars.

Having grown up among people, Travis had been socialized to humans since birth. A neighbor said he used to play around and wrestle with Travis. The neighbor added that the animal always knew when to stop and paid close attention to his owner. "He listened better than my nephews," the neighbor remarked after Travis had mauled Nash. "I just don't know why he would do that."

Travis could open doors using keys, dress himself, water plants, feed hay to his owners' horses, eat at a table with the rest of the family, and drink wine from a stemmed glass; he was so fond of ice cream that he learned the schedules of passing ice cream trucks. He logged onto the computer to look at pictures, watched television using a remote control, and brushed his teeth using a Water Pik. He enjoyed watching baseball on television. Travis had also driven a car on several occasions.

Jerome died from cancer in 2004, and the Herolds' only child died in a car accident in 2000; as a result, Sandra Herold regarded Travis almost as a surrogate son and pampered him. Sandra slept and bathed with Travis, saying after his death, "I'm, like, hollow now. He slept with me every night. Until you've eaten with a chimp and bathed with a chimp, you don't know a chimp."

Incidents

2003 incident
In October 2003, Travis escaped from the Herolds' car and held up traffic at a busy intersection; he was on the loose for several hours. The incident began after a pedestrian threw an empty soda bottle at the car that went through a partially open window and struck Travis while they were stopped at a traffic light. Startled, Travis unbuckled his seat belt, opened the car door and chased the man, but did not catch him. When police arrived, they lured the chimpanzee into the car several times, only to have Travis let himself out of another door and occasionally chase the officers around the car. The new law took effect in 2009, and as of Travis's death in the same year, no one in the state had applied to adopt a chimpanzee. The Connecticut Department of Environmental Protection (DEP) did not enforce the law on the Herolds because they had owned  Travis for so long, and the DEP did not believe Travis posed a public safety risk.

2009 attack 
On February 16, 2009, at around 3:40 p.m., Travis attacked Sandra Herold's then 55-year-old friend, Charla Nash, inflicting devastating injuries to her face and limbs. Travis had left the house with Sandra Herold's car keys, and Nash came to help get the chimp back in the house; upon seeing Nash holding a Tickle Me Elmo, one of his favorite toys, Travis flew into a rage and attacked her. Travis was familiar with Nash, who had also worked at the Herolds' towing company, although Nash had a different hairstyle at the time of the attack, which may have also confused and alarmed him. He had been taking medication for Lyme disease. Herold attempted to stop Travis by hitting him on the head with a shovel and stabbing him in the back with a butcher knife.

Herold later said, "For me to do something like that, put a knife in him, was like putting one in myself." The chimp turned around, she said, as if to say, "Mom, what did you do?" The animal grew angrier. Herold, at this point, believing Nash to be dead, then rushed to her car, locked herself inside and called 9-1-1. Travis' screams can be heard in the background at the start of the tape as Herold pleads for the police, who initially believed the call to be a hoax until she said, "He's eating her!" Emergency medical services waited for police before approaching the house. When they arrived, Travis headed towards the police car, tried to open a locked passenger door, and smashed a side-view mirror. Then he went around to the driver's-side door and opened it, at which point Officer Frank Chiafari shot him four times with his service pistol. Travis retreated to the house, where he was found dead next to his cage.

Aftermath 
The emergency crew described Nash's injuries as "horrendous". Within the following 72 hours, Nash underwent more than seven hours of surgery on her face and hands by four teams of surgeons. The hospital provided counseling to its staff members who initially treated her because of the extraordinary nature of Nash's wounds. Paramedics noted she lost her hands, nose, eyes, lips, and mid-face bone structure and received significant brain tissue injuries. Doctors removed chimpanzee hair and teeth that had been implanted into her bones and reattached her jaw, but announced on April 7, 2009, that Nash would be blind for life. Her injuries made her a possible candidate for an experimental face transplant surgery. After initial treatment at Stamford Hospital, Nash was transferred to the Cleveland Clinic. Her family started a trust fund to raise money to pay her "unfathomable" medical bills and support her daughter. Nash revealed her damaged face in public for the first time on The Oprah Winfrey Show on November 11, 2009. She was not at that time in physical pain from the attack, and family members said she hoped to leave the Cleveland Clinic soon. Pictures have surfaced on the Internet displaying Nash's face before and after the attack.

In accordance with standard procedure, Travis' head was taken to the state laboratory for a rabies test, and the body was taken to the University of Connecticut for a necropsy. The head tested negative for rabies, but there was Xanax (Alprazolam) remaining in his system. Necropsy results in May 2009 confirmed the chimp was overweight and had been stabbed. The remains were cremated at All Pets Crematory in Stamford on February 25, 2009. Toxicology reports confirmed Sandra's statement that she had given Travis Xanax-laced tea the day of the attack, which could have exacerbated his aggression. Xanax is a short-acting, potent anti-anxiety drug that can cause disinhibition and disorientation and occasionally paradoxical reactions of hallucination, aggression, rage, and mania in humans.

Shortly after the attack, a woman who had lived in the same area as Herold came forward with information that, in 1996, the chimpanzee had bitten her hand and tried to pull her into a vehicle as she greeted him. She claimed to have complained to the Herolds and to police, who stated they had no record of any such complaint. Afterward, PETA members allegedly harassed Herold, although the organization stated that it did not have any official involvement.

On May 24, 2010, 15 months after the attack, Sandra Herold died suddenly of a ruptured aortic aneurysm at the age of 72. Her attorney, Robert Golger, released the following statement: "Mrs. Herold had suffered a series of heartbreaking losses over the last several years, beginning with the death of her first and only daughter who was killed in a car accident, then her husband, then her beloved chimp Travis, as well as the tragic maiming of friend and employee Charla Nash. In the end, her heart, which had been broken so many times before, could take no more."

On May 28, 2011, Nash underwent transplant surgery performed by a team led by Bohdan Pomahač at Brigham and Women's Hospital, receiving a donated face and hands. The transplant of the hands was initially successful, but because Nash developed pneumonia shortly thereafter, doctors were forced to remove her newly transplanted hands 5 days after the transplant due to the infection and resulting poor circulation.

Lawsuits
In March 2009, Charla Nash's family attorney filed a $50 million lawsuit against Sandra Herold. On May 6, a Stamford judge froze Herold's assets, valued at US$10 million. Other potential defendants included the DEP, the city of Stamford, and the veterinarian who prescribed the Xanax. The defense claimed the chimp had no violent behavior before the attack, and the two accusations in the 1990s attacks were untrue because the chimp had no teeth at the time. In November 2012, Nash reached a settlement with Herold's estate and received approximately $4 million.

Nash attempted to sue the state of Connecticut in 2013 but her claim was denied. She had asserted that officials knew the animal was dangerous but did nothing about it. Nash's petition to sue was denied on the basis that at the time of the attack, no statute existed that prohibited the private ownership of a chimpanzee. In July 2013, Nash's attorneys began efforts to appeal the court's decision.

In media
News reports of the incident spread as far as China. The attack, similar to another chimpanzee attack four years earlier in California, provoked discussion about the logic of keeping such exotic animals as pets by sources such as Time magazine and primatologists Jane Goodall and Frans de Waal. 

Travis' escape and the subsequent attack of Charla Nash were used as part of the "Chimps" episode of the Animal Planet 2010-2011 documentary series: Fatal Attractions. Sound from the original 9-1-1 call, radio traffic from the police shooting of Travis, and the aftermath of the hunt were used in the episode. In June 2009, American deathcore band Suicide Silence released their second album No Time to Bleed, featuring the track "...And Then She Bled", a song recreation of the 911 emergency phone call placed by Sandra Herold during the February 16, 2009 attack.

An attack similar to the incident is depicted in the 2022 film Nope, in which an animal actor chimp is startled on set and attacks its human co-stars. The young woman mauled by the chimp in the film is shown years later to wear a mesh covering over her face similar to the one worn by Nash.

Influence on legislation
Connecticut Attorney General Richard Blumenthal noted that a defect in the existing 2004 Connecticut law prohibiting chimpanzees of Travis' size, itself a result of the 2003 incident, allowed the attack to occur. A Connecticut DEP spokesman clarified that Travis was exempt because he did not appear to present a public health risk and was owned before the registration requirement began. Blumenthal subsequently sent letters to legislative leaders and the DEP Commissioner, asking them to support a proposed law that would ban all potentially dangerous exotic animals, such as chimpanzees, crocodiles, and venomous snakes, from being kept in a residential setting in Connecticut. The DEP was seeking a similar law banning large primates and, after the incident, announced that it sought the help of the public, police officers, and animal control officers to report such pets to the agency. The editorial board of The Advocate newspaper in Stamford also supported banning the possession of all exotic birds and reptiles.

U.S. Representative Earl Blumenauer of Oregon, introduced the Captive Primate Safety Act introduced on January 6, 2009, which would have added monkeys, great apes, and lemurs to the list of "prohibited wildlife species" that cannot be sold or purchased through interstate and foreign sales. The attack led the Humane Society of the United States to join with the Wildlife Conservation Society in supporting the Act. Travis' attack resulted in the bill's reintroduction by co-sponsor, Rep. Mark Kirk, on February 23, 2009. Rep. Rob Bishop argued against the bill during the floor debate, noting it would cost $4 million annually and do nothing directly to prevent chimpanzee attacks on humans. He also claimed such attacks are relatively rare. Twenty states and the District of Columbia already have laws banning primates as pets. On February 23, 2009, the House voted 323 to 95 in favor of the bill, and the editorial boards of several major newspapers, including The New York Times and Newsday, supported its passage. The bill was never taken up by the U.S. Senate.

Frank Chiafari—the police officer who fatally shot Travis—was initially unable to get his therapy for depression and anxiety covered after the incident. This led to legislation proposed in 2010 that would cover a police officer's compensation for mental or emotional impairment after using justifiable deadly force to kill an animal.

See also 
 List of individual apes

Notes

References

External links
 The Hartford Courant, a small photo gallery in The Hartford Courant's web site, showing Herold, Travis, and Nash

1995 animal births
2009 animal deaths
Travis
Chimpanzee actors
Deaths by firearm in Connecticut
History of Stamford, Connecticut
Individual primates in the United States
Individual chimpanzees
Primate attacks